Maillardia is a genus of plant in family Moraceae.

Species
 Maillardia borbonica Duch.
 Maillardia montana Leandri

Moraceae
Moraceae genera
Taxonomy articles created by Polbot